Cara Black and Liezel Huber were the defending champions, and successfully defended their title, defeating Květa Peschke and Ai Sugiyama in the final, 6–1, 6–3.

Seeds

Draw

Draw

Diamond Games
Proximus Diamond Games
Proximus